Kalib is a given name and surname. Notable people with the name include:

Kalib Starnes (born 1975), Canadian mixed martial artist
Sylvan Kalib (born 1929), American music theorist

See also
Kaleb (name)